The United Kingdom competed in the Eurovision Song Contest 1998. The BBC organised a public selection to select its entry for the contest, The Great British Song Contest 1998. Eight songs competed over two rounds, with four songs selected through a radio-broadcast semi-final advancing to the televised final round, held on 15 March 1998, where viewers selected the winning entry through televoting. Imaani received the most votes and was selected to represent the UK in the contest with the song "Where Are You?". Imaani performed 16th at the international contest, and at the close of the voting process the UK finished in second place with 166 points, the nation's 15th second-place finish since its debut.

Background 

Prior to the 1998 contest, the United Kingdom had participated in the Eurovision Song Contest 40 times since their first entry in 1957 and had competed in all but two editions of the contest. Before this year's event, the UK had won the contest five times: in 1967 with the song "Puppet on a String" performed by Sandie Shaw, in 1969 with the song "Boom Bang-a-Bang" performed by Lulu, in 1976 with the song "Save Your Kisses for Me" performed by Brotherhood of Man, in 1981 with the song "Making Your Mind Up" performed by Bucks Fizz, and in 1997 with the song "Love Shine a Light" performed by Katrina and the Waves. The nation had also finished in second place on 14 occasions, more than any other country.

Per the rules of the 1998 contest, as the previous year's winning country and contest hosts, the UK was given an automatic place in the competition, with the British Broadcasting Corporation (BBC) subsequently included on the European Broadcasting Union's (EBU) list of the 25 countries that had signed up to partake in the contest. The BBC opted to select its chosen entry for the contest through a national final entitled The Great British Song Contest 1998.

Before Eurovision

The Great British Song Contest 1998 

The BBC organised a public selection process to determine its entry for the Eurovision Song Contest 1998. The Great British Song Contest was organised for the third time, following the same format used the previous year: after a public submission process, eight songs were selected to compete in a semi-final broadcast on BBC Radio 2, where listeners would choose four entries via televoting to progress to a final on BBC One. A second round of public voting during the televised broadcast would determine the winning song that would represent the UK at Eurovision. More than 800 songs were submitted to the competition and following several rounds of shortlisting from these songs, the eight semi-finalists were determined.

Semi-final 
The eight songs which featured in the semi-final were previewed on the Radio 2 shows Wake Up to Wogan and The Ken Bruce Show between 2 and 5 February 1998, with two songs being played each day on both programmes. The semi-final was then held on 6 February, hosted by Ken Bruce and Terry Wogan. Once all songs had been played, listeners were invited to phone in and vote for their favourites from 9–10am. The result was announced at the end of the broadcast; the qualifying songs were announced in alphabetical order by title.

Final 
Each of the finalists featured on weekly editions of The National Lottery Draw on BBC One, with one act appearing each week over a period of four weeks: Kitt appeared on the 21 February 1998 broadcast; Alberta on 28 February 1998; Imaani on 7 March 1998; and The Collective on 14 March 1998. A free promotional CD featuring extracts of the four finalists was also released and made available in high street record shops, while the four finalists and the previous year's winning act Katrina Leskanich performed live at London's G-A-Y nightclub on 14 March 1998. Between the semi-final and the final, Kitt changed her stage name to Sapphire.

The final was held on 15 March 1998, broadcast on BBC One and presented by Wogan. The broadcast featured the same performances of the acts as those featured on The National Lottery Draw, with Wogan providing live links between songs and short pre-recorded introductions by the songwriters of each song preceding each performance. Other segments of the broadcast included behind-the-scenes footage featuring Ulrika Jonsson at Birmingham's National Indoor Arena, the venue for the then-upcoming Eurovision Song Contest, an interview with Leskanich hosted by Jonsson and clips during the end credits of previous UK winning Eurovision performances. Following a brief recap of the participating acts, a one-hour voting window was opened for viewers to vote through telephone at a cost of 10p per call and via the internet; the results were subsequently announced by Wogan on 21 March 1998 during that evening's National Lottery Draw on BBC One, with the top three acts announced in reverse order along with the number of votes received. 2.66 million viewers watched the Great British Song Contest final and the National Lottery Draw which featured the results attracted an audience of 9.81 million.

Promotion  
Ahead of the contest, Imaani made several appearances on UK television programmes to promote her entry to the British public. Imaani performed her Eurovision song on the BBC's children's programmes Blue Peter on 23 March 1998, Live & Kicking on both 28 March 1998 and 11 April 1998, and Fully Booked on 3 May 1998, while she also appeared on the BBC's music chart show Top of the Pops on both 8 and 22 May 1998. BBC Radio 2 also produced a radio documentary, titled Going for a Song, broadcast 9 May 1998, the day of the Eurovision final, which followed Imaani's preparations for the Eurovision Song Contest. "Where Are You?" was released in the formats of both CD and cassette on 9 March 1998, featuring an additional ballad mix of the song. The song peaked at number 15 on the UK Singles Chart, while it also charted on the Netherlands' Mega Top 100 and Belgium's Ultratop chart.

At Eurovision 

As the winners of the previous year's event, the UK was given the chance to host the Eurovision Song Contest in 1998, with the BBC selecting the National Indoor Arena in Birmingham as the venue of the contest, held on 9 May 1998. Following confirmation of the 25-country participant list, the running order for the contest was decided by a draw held on 13 November 1997; the UK was assigned position 16, following  and preceding .

Imaani took part in technical rehearsals at the venue on 5 and 7 May 1998, followed by dress rehearsals on 8 and 9 May. The contest was hosted by Wogan and Jonsson and was broadcast in the UK on television and radio, with Wogan also providing commentary for BBC One and Bruce doing likewise on BBC Radio 2. Imaani performed alongside the BBC Concert Orchestra, which was conducted by James McMillan for her performance.

At the end of the contest, the UK finished in second place, receiving a total of 166 points.

Voting 
The same voting system in use since 1975 was again implemented for the contest, with each country providing 1–8, 10 and 12 points to their 10 highest-ranking songs, with countries not allowed to vote for themselves. For the first time however, the contest results were determined predominantly by public voting via telephone, following a successful trial among five countries the previous year; an eight-member back-up jury was also assembled in case technical failures rendered the telephone votes invalid.

A total of 407,167 valid votes were registered in the UK in total during the five-minute voting window, which determined the UK's points; the BBC subsequently published a full breakdown of the votes cast for each country after the Eurovision Song Contest. Bruce was also appointed the spokesperson and announced the results of the UK vote during the broadcast.

Notes

References

Further reading 

 
 

1998
Countries in the Eurovision Song Contest 1998
Eurovision
Eurovision